Florian Eigler (born 12 May 1990) is a German freestyle skier. He was born in Füssen. He made his FIS World Cup debut for Germany in 2010. He competed at the 2014 Winter Olympics in Sochi, in ski-cross.

References

External links 
 
 
 

1990 births
Living people
Freestyle skiers at the 2014 Winter Olympics
German male freestyle skiers
Olympic freestyle skiers of Germany
Sportspeople from Füssen
21st-century German people